Milano Porta Genova is a railway station in Milan, Italy.

Services
Milano Porta Genova is terminus of the regional trains to Mortara, operated by the Lombard railway company Trenord.

See also
Railway stations in Milan

External links

Porta Genova
Milan S Lines stations
Railway stations opened in 1870
1870 establishments in Italy
Railway stations in Italy opened in the 19th century